Asha Patel (6 September 1977 – 12 December 2021) was an Indian politician from Gujarat.

Biography 
Patel belonged to Vishol village in Mehsana district, Gujarat. She was a daughter of Dwarkadas and Hiraben.

She had studied B. Sc. in 1997, M. Sc. in 2000 and had received PhD in Chemistry in 2005; from Hemchandracharya North Gujarat University. She was a professor. She was an executive member of Umiya Temple, Unjha.

She had participated in 2015 Patidar reservation agitation.

She was elected to the Gujarat Legislative Assembly from Unjha in the 2017 Gujarat Legislative Assembly election as a member of the Indian National Congress. She later left Indian National Congress and joined Bharatiya Janata Party. She won a by-election in 2019 for the same seat.

Patel died in Ahmedabad from complications of dengue fever on 12 December 2021, at the age of 44.

Personal life 
Patel was unmarried. She had three elder sisters and a younger brother.

References

1977 births
2021 deaths
Bharatiya Janata Party politicians from Gujarat
Indian National Congress politicians from Gujarat
People from Mehsana district
Women in Gujarat politics
Deaths from dengue fever
Gujarat MLAs 2017–2022
21st-century Indian women politicians